Lee Seong-bae (born 7 April 1990) is a South Korean rugby sevens player. He competed in the men's tournament at the 2020 Summer Olympics.

References

External links
 

1990 births
Living people
Male rugby sevens players
Olympic rugby sevens players of South Korea
Rugby sevens players at the 2020 Summer Olympics
Place of birth missing (living people)